Yasna Poliana may refer to several places in Ukraine:

Chernihiv Oblast
 Yasna Poliana, Chernihiv Oblast, village in Novhorod-Siverskyi Raion

Donetsk Oblast
 Yasna Poliana, Kramatorsk Raion, Donetsk Oblast, urban-type settlement in Kramatorsk Raion
 Yasna Poliana, Volnovakha Raion, Donetsk Oblast, rural settlement in Volnovakha Raion

Kharkiv Oblast
 Yasna Poliana, Kharkiv Oblast, village in Krasnohrad Raion

Kherson Oblast
 Yasna Poliana, Henichesk urban hromada, Henichesk Raion, Kherson Oblast, village in Henichesk Raion
 Yasna Poliana, Novotroitske settlement hromada, Henichesk Raion, Kherson Oblast, village in Henichesk Raion
 Yasna Poliana, Kakhovka Raion, Kherson Oblast, village in Kakhovka Raion
 Yasna Poliana, Kherson Raion, Kherson Oblast, village in Kherson Raion

Mykolaiv Oblast
 Yasna Poliana, Bashtanka Raion, Mykolaiv Oblast, rural settlement in Bashtanka Raion
 Yasna Poliana, Nova Odesa urban hromada, Mykolaiv Raion, Mykolaiv Oblast, village in Mykolaiv Raion
 Yasna Poliana, Mishkovo-Pohorilove rural hromada, Mykolaiv Raion, Mykolaiv Oblast, village in Mykolaiv Raion
 Yasna Poliana, Olshanske settlement hromada, Mykolaiv Raion, Mykolaiv Oblast, village in Mykolaiv Raion
 Yasna Poliana, Voznesensk Raion, Mykolaiv Oblast, village in Voznesensk Raion

Sumy Oblast
 Yasna Poliana, Sumy Oblast, village in Shostka Raion

Zaporizhzhia Oblast
 Yasna Poliana, Melitopol Raion, Zaporizhzhia Oblast, village in Melitopol Raion
 Yasna Poliana, Vasylivka Raion, Zaporizhzhia Oblast, village in Vasylivka Raion
 Yasna Poliana, Zaporizhzhia Raion, Zaporizhzhia Oblast, village in Zaporizhzhia Raion

Zhytomyr Oblast
 Yasna Poliana, Zhytomyr Oblast, village in Zhytomyr Raion